Silometopoides is a genus of sheet weavers that was first described by K. Y. Eskov in 1990.

Species
 it contains nine species, found in Europe, Asia, the United States, Canada, and Greenland:
Silometopoides asiaticus (Eskov, 1995) – Kazakhstan
Silometopoides koponeni (Eskov & Marusik, 1994) – Russia
Silometopoides mongolensis Eskov & Marusik, 1992 – Russia, Mongolia
Silometopoides pampia (Chamberlin, 1949) (type) – Russia, Canada, Greenland
Silometopoides pingrensis (Crosby & Bishop, 1933) – USA
Silometopoides sibiricus (Eskov, 1989) – Russia
Silometopoides sphagnicola Eskov & Marusik, 1992 – Russia (Europe, Siberia)
Silometopoides tibialis (Heimer, 1987) – Russia, Mongolia
Silometopoides yodoensis (Oi, 1960) – Russia, China, Korea, Japan

See also
 List of Linyphiidae species (Q–Z)

References

Araneomorphae genera
Linyphiidae
Spiders of Asia
Spiders of North America
Spiders of Russia